Simo Häyhä (17December 1905 1April 2002), often referred to by his nickname, The White Death, was a Finnish military sniper in World War II during the 1939–1940 Winter War against the Soviet Union. He used a Finnish-produced M/28-30 (a variant of the Mosin–Nagant rifle) and a Suomi KP/-31 submachine gun. He is believed to have killed over 500 enemy soldiers during the Winter War, the highest number of sniper kills in any major war. Because of this, he is often regarded as the deadliest sniper of all time.

Häyhä estimated in his private war memoir that he shot around 500 Soviet soldiers. The memoir, titled  (War memoirs), was written in 1940, a few months after he was wounded, and described his experiences in the Winter War from 30 November 1939 to 13 March 1940. Hidden for decades, the memoir was discovered in 2017.

Early life and youth 
Häyhä was born in the Kiiskinen hamlet of the Rautjärvi municipality in the Viipuri Province of southern Finland near the border with Russia. He was the seventh of eight children in a Lutheran family of farmers; his father, Juho Häyhä, was the owner of the Mattila farm while Simo's mother, Katriina (née Vilkko) was a loving and hard-working farmer's wife. He attended school in the village of Miettilä in Kivennapa parish and cultivated his home farm together with his eldest brother. He was a farmer, hunter, and skier prior to his military service.

Militia and military service 

Häyhä joined the Finnish voluntary militia Civil Guard (Suojeluskunta) at the age of 17. He was successful in shooting competitions in the Viipuri Province; his home was reportedly full of trophies for marksmanship. He was not keen to hog the spotlight, and accordingly in group photos from his youth he usually stood at the back, until his later successes forced him to take centre stage.

In 1925, at the age of 19, Häyhä began his 15-month compulsory military service in the Bicycle Battalion 2 in Raivola, Viipuri Province. He attended the Non-Commissioned Officer School and served as a conscript officer in the Bicycle Battalion 1 in Terijoki. However, he did not receive formal sniper training until a year before the war in 1938 at a training centre in Utti.

According to Major Tapio Saarelainen—who met Häyhä several times and has written five books about him, including his biography—Häyhä was able to estimate distances with an accuracy of 1 metre (3.3 ft) up to 150 metres (500 ft). Saarelainen notes that during his Civil Guard training, Häyhä once hit a target 16 times from 150 metres away in just one minute. "This was an unbelievable accomplishment with a bolt action rifle, considering that each cartridge had to be manually fed with a fixed magazine that held together five cartridges."

Winter War service 
He was dressed completely in white camouflage; Soviet troops were not issued camouflage uniforms for most of the war, making them easily visible to snipers in winter conditions. Joseph Stalin had purged military experts in the late 1930s as part of the Great Purge, and the Red Army was consequently highly disorganized.

Finnish sources state that Häyhä was nicknamed "The White Death" by the Red Army. The name "White Death" has been suggested to originate entirely in Finnish propaganda, rather than having been given to Häyhä by the Russians; according to information from prisoners, to the Russians "White Death" referred to a severe frost in the deep forest. Häyhä having the nickname "White Death" first appeared in the Finnish Winter War literature of the late 1980s. During the war, the "White Death" was one of the leading themes of Finnish propaganda. Finnish newspapers frequently featured the invisible Finnish soldier, thus creating a hero of mythical proportions. To add to the myth, he was also nicknamed "The Magic Shooter" among Finns (in close reference to the Finnish word for "sniper").

Häyhä's war memoir states that they captured a Soviet soldier, blindfolded him, spun him around until he was disoriented, and then took him to a party in the tent of Häyhä's company Lieutenant Aarne "The Terror of Morocco" Juutilainen. The Soviet soldier was overjoyed by the carousing and was disappointed when he was released.

Achievements as a sniper 

All of Häyhä's kills were accomplished in less than 100 days, an average of five per day at a time of year with very few daylight hours. His kill count as a sniper was based on his own reporting, with the confirmation of his comrades, and only those who were verified to be dead were counted. No count was taken when several snipers shot at the same target. Enemy soldiers killed with a submachine gun with Häyhä as a group leader were not counted.

Häyhä's division commander Antero Svensson credited him with 219 confirmed kills with a rifle and an equal number of kills by submachine gun, when he awarded Häyhä with an honorary rifle on 17 February 1940. On 21 December 1939, Häyhä achieved his highest daily count of 25 kills. In his diary, military chaplain Antti Rantamaa reported 259 confirmed kills made by rifle and an equal number of kills by submachine gun from the beginning of the war until 7 March 1940, one day after Häyhä was severely wounded. Later in his book, Rantamaa credited Häyhä with a total of 542 kills.

Some of Häyhä's figures are from a Finnish Army document, counted from the beginning of the war, 30 November 1939:
 22 December 1939: 138 sniper kills in 22 days
 26 January 1940: 199 sniper kills (61 in 35 days)
 17 February 1940: 219 sniper kills (20 in 22 days)
 7 March 1940 (one day after he was wounded): total of 259 sniper kills (40 in 18 days)

Häyhä never discussed it publicly, but his own private memoir, discovered in 2017, states a number. He begins by stating that "this is his sin list", and estimates the total number he shot to be around 500.

Finnish historian Risto Marjomaa questions the large number, as confirmation of casualties was difficult due to the absence of the bodies. In his article, published by the National Biography of Finland, Marjomaa credited Häyhä with the total number of "more than two hundred" kills. Complicating matters further is the use of Häyhä's achievements as a tool of propaganda: the Finnish press built a hero's myth around Häyhä at the early stage of the war.

Firearms and tactics 
Häyhä used his issued Civil Guard rifle, an early series SAKO M/28-30, serial number 35281, Civil Guard number S60974. It was a Finnish Civil Guard variant of the Mosin–Nagant rifle known as "Pystykorva" ( due to the front sight's resemblance to the head of a spitz-type dog) chambered in the Finnish-designed Mosin–Nagant cartridge 7.62×53R. When fighting as a group leader with the rest of his unit, he used a Suomi KP/-31 submachine gun.

Häyhä preferred iron sights over telescopic sights, as they enable a sniper to present a smaller target for the enemy (a sniper must raise his head a few centimetres higher when using a telescopic sight), and can be relied on even in extreme cold, unlike telescopic sights which tend to cloud up in cold weather. Another disadvantage of telescopic sights is that sunlight may reflect off the lenses and reveal the sniper's position. Häyhä did not have prior training with scoped rifles, and therefore preferred not to switch to the Soviet scoped rifle (M/91-30 PE or PEM).

Häyhä dealt with the intense cold by dressing properly with multiple layers of clothing. He kept sugar and bread in his pockets, consuming them for the calories necessary to keep his body warm. His slight stature of  assisted him in disguising his position. Hidden in a snow pit, he could lie still and observe the enemy for long periods of time. It was Häyhä's custom to move, well before daybreak, to the position he had prepared, and stay there until after sunset. He would frequently pack dense mounds of snow in front of his position to conceal himself, provide padding for his rifle, and reduce the characteristic puff of snow stirred up by the muzzle blast. He was known to keep snow in his mouth while sniping to prevent his breath in the cold air from giving away his position.

Injury 

On 6 March 1940, Häyhä was severely wounded after an explosive bullet fired by a Red Army soldier hit his lower left jaw. After the battle, as he appeared to be dead, he was placed on a pile of dead bodies. A fellow soldier, under orders from his commanding officer, searched for Häyhä, noticed a leg twitching among the pile and found Häyhä alive, although unconscious. He was evacuated by fellow soldiers who said that "half his face was missing". The bullet had removed his upper jaw, most of his lower jaw, and most of his left cheek.

Rumours of Häyhä's death spread around in Finland and the Soviet Union. He regained consciousness a week later on 13 March, the day that peace was declared. He read about his own death in a newspaper, and sent a letter to the paper to correct the misunderstanding. He spent 14 months recovering from his wounds and endured 26 surgeries.

Häyhä wished to serve in the Continuation War (1941–1944). However, he was excused due to the severity of his facial injuries, from which he was still recovering.

Honours 

Häyhä was awarded the First and Second class Medals of Liberty, as well as the Third and Fourth class Crosses of Liberty. The latter two were normally granted to only commissioned officers. As an additional honour, on 17 February 1940, he received a nameplated SAKO M/28-30 “Pystykorva” Honorary  Rifle (serial number 100 781), donated by Eugen Johansson, a Swedish businessman and supporter of Finland. According to an unofficial count, he had shot 219 Red Army soldiers at the time. He later donated the rifle to the Karelia Jaeger Battalion's Heritage Room, from where it was transferred to the Finnish Military Museum's collection after the dissolution of the North Karelia Brigade in 2013.

Shortly after the Winter War, on 28 August 1940, Finnish Field Marshal Carl Gustaf Emil Mannerheim promoted Häyhä straight from alikersantti (the lowest military rank of a non-commissioned officer) to vänrikki (the first military rank of an officer). In 1941, Häyhä was also nominated as a Knight of the Mannerheim Cross, the most distinguished Finnish military honour. However, the nomination remained "under consideration". He also received the Kollaa fighters' medal, the silver version of the Cross of Kollaa Battle, number 4.

The Kollaa and Simo Häyhä Museum (Kollaa ja Simo Häyhä -museo) is located in the village of Miettilä at Rautjärvi, in a former infirmary. The museum, opened in 1983, covers the Battle of Kollaa, and features a special permanent exhibition dedicated to the life of Simo Häyhä.

Post-war life 

It took several years for Häyhä to recuperate from his wound which required lengthy treatments and several surgeries. Although his face remained disfigured, he otherwise made a full recovery. After World War II, he was given a farm in Valkjärvi ("Whitelake"), Ruokolahti, a small municipality located in southeastern Finland near the Russian border. He became a successful moose hunter and dog breeder. In addition to farming, he enjoyed hunting, and his hunting parties over the years included the President of Finland, Urho Kekkonen.

However, some people did not approve of his actions during the Winter War; he was met with hate and even death threats. The injuries he sustained in the war left recognizable facial scars, so as a well-known person, he avoided large groups of people. He never married, and lived as a bachelor. He enjoyed working, but he suffered from loneliness and fear; nights were especially difficult for him. However, he had friends and also spent time at his parents' and siblings' homes after the war. Eventually farm work became too difficult, so he put the farm up for rent, and moved to an apartment building in the centre of Ruokolahti.

Häyhä was known as a modest man who never boasted of his wartime merits. He rarely spoke of the war and his experiences. When asked in 1998 how he had become such a good sniper, he replied simply: "Practice". In an Independence Day interview with Helsingin Sanomat in December 2001, shortly before his 96th birthday, Häyhä opened up about his war experiences. He was asked if he felt remorse for having killed so many people. He replied, "I did what I was told to do, as well as I could. There would be no Finland unless everyone else had done the same."

Häyhä spent his last years in a war veterans' nursing home in Hamina, where he died in 2002 at the age of 96. He was buried in his home town of Ruokolahti.

In popular culture 
Swedish heavy metal band Sabaton composed the song "White Death" in honor of Häyhä, which was released in 2010 on their album Coat of Arms. Scottish black/thrash metal band Achren's three-song The White Death EP from 2014 is dedicated entirely to Häyhä, right down to the cover art. Japanese metal band To Mega Therion has made a song called Simo Hayha, which appears on the 2015 Yog = Sothoth album.

In 2011, Philip Kaufman began filming HBO's Hemingway & Gellhorn (first airdate 28 May 2012), which features Martha Gellhorn (played by Nicole Kidman) reporting from Finland during the Winter War. In this section, Steven Wiig portrays Häyhä, leading a group of Finnish soldiers to shelter.

A film about Häyhä called The White Death has been planned since 2017. The film is directed by David McElroy and written by James Poirier.

American author Arna Bontemps Hemenway has written a short story about Häyhä, called "Wolves of Karelia", which was published in the August 2019 issue of The Atlantic magazine.

Häyhä's story has been adapted in two manga, in one called The White Witch (Shiroi Majo) by Nagakawa Naruki, the main character is named Simo Häyhä, but is female. He also appears in the manga Record of Ragnarok (Shūmatsu no Warukyūre) by Shinya Umemura and Takumi Fukui, in which he is depicted as a fighter for humanity.

References

Further reading 
 P. Sarjanen, . .
 Tapio A. M. Saarelainen, . .
 Tapio A. M. Saarelainen, . .
 William R. Trotter, Frozen Hell: The Russo-Finnish Winter War of 1939/40, Algonquin Books of Chapel Hill, 2000. .
 Adrian Gilbert, Tom C. McKenney, Dan Mills, Roger Moorhouse, Charles Sasser, Tim Newark, The Sniper Anthology: Snipers of the Second World War, Pelican Publishing Company, 2012. .

External links 

 Kollaa and Simo Häyhä Museum
 Meeting a Legend: Simo Häyhä (John Mitchell, mosinnagant.net, 2002; archived 2004)
 Simo Häyhä – The Deadliest Sniper In History (Forces.net, 2020)

1905 births
2002 deaths
Finnish military personnel of World War II
Finnish military snipers
Winter War
People from Rautjärvi
People from Viipuri Province (Grand Duchy of Finland)
Recipients of the Order of the Cross of Liberty, 3rd Class